Soulstar is the third studio album by American singer Musiq Soulchild. It was released on December 9, 2003. It debuted on the Billboard 200 at number thirteen, spending 23 weeks on the chart and exiting on May 29, 2004; on the Top R&B/Hip-Hop albums chart where it peaked at number three, it spent 37 weeks, falling off on September 9, 2004.

This would be Musiq's final album for Def Jam's Def Soul subsidiary, before he transitioned to Atlantic in a de facto trade for his next album Luvanmusiq (2007).

The vinyl release of Soulstar has a different track listing from the CD. The songs "whereareyougoing" and "leaveamessage" do not appear on the vinyl version of the album.

Critical reception

Soulstar garnered positive reviews from music critics. AllMusic editor Andy Kellman said that despite the length of the record, he praised Musiq's growing musicianship to craft modern R&B tracks that don't carry gimmicks or personas that give his performances on them "a sense of intimacy that many of his contemporaries lack." He concluded by calling it "one of the finest contemporary R&B releases of 2003, with both style and substance in good supply." Raymond Fiore from Entertainment Weekly said of Musiq being able to transcend his "humble-pie persona" amongst the other neo soul artists throughout the album: "But while the former ”Soulchild” is maddeningly predictable, the grooves on Soulstar prove surprisingly rewarding. Just when you think Musiq’s songs remain the same, he unleashes a series of harmonically lush chords that elevate him way above average." Steve Jones of USA Today said, "Although he often wears his Wonder-Hathaway influences on his sleeve, his ever-improving songwriting and vocal phrasings set him apart. Love themes predominate, but his songs often paint detailed scenarios and are anything but simple." In a mixed review for the New York Times, Jon Pareles praised Musiq's lyricism for being reminiscent of '70s Stevie Wonder but was off-put by Ivan Barias' production causing said lyrics in the tracks to "ramble until they begin to sound like recitatives." He later called Soulstar "an album of dense, fascinating textures and articulate lyrics that ends up pleasant but prosy."

Track listing
 Credits adapted from liner notes and AllMusic.

Samples
 "soulstar" contains a sample of "I Found Love (When I Found You)", as performed by The Spinners
 "youloveme" contains a sample of "Soft Touch", as performed by Henry Mancini
 "babymother" contains a sample of "Shadows", as performed by Tom Scott
 "romancipation" contains a sample of "The Jam", as performed by Graham Central Station
 "givemorelove" contains a sample of "Getaway Day", as performed by Tom Scott

Personnel
Credits adapted from liner notes and AllMusic. 

88-Keys - Producer
AAries	- Guest Artist, Primary Artist, Vocals (Background)
Andre - Voices, Performer
Ivan "Orthodox" Barias - Arranger, Composer, Engineer, Executive Producer, Instrumentation, Multi Instruments, Producer, Programming, Tracking
Junius Bervine	- Composer, Instrumentation, Multi Instruments, Producer
Algebra Blessett - Performer, Telephone Voice, Voices
Jeff Bradshaw - Trombone
Leesa Brunson - A&R Assistance
Matt Cappy - Trumpet
Chad - Performer, Telephone Voice, Voices
Charnee - Performer, Telephone Voice, Voices
Bootsy Collins	 Performer, Telephone Voice, Voices
Troy Corbin - Vocals (Background)
Andre Dandridge - Engineer, Telephone Voice, Tracking
Tina Davis - A&R
Maurice "DJ Aktive" "The Scratchologist" Deloach - Guest Artist, Primary Artist, Scratching
Dox - Performer, Telephone Voice, Voices
Vikter Duplaix - Percussion, Producer
Erickache - Performer, Telephone Voice, Voices
Roger Erickson	 - Photography
Chris Gehringer - Mastering
Serban Ghenea - Mixing
Theodore Gilbert - Bass
Deidre Graham	- Marketing
Larry Graham - Composer
Cee Lo Green - Guest Artist, Vocal Arrangement, Vocals, Vocals (Background), Composer, Primary Artist
Akisia Grigsby	- Art Direction, Design
Nicole Guiland	- Vocals (Background)
Gutta Fam - Producer, Vocal Arrangement
Carvin "Ransum" Haggins - Composer, Engineer, Executive Producer, Performer, Producer, Telephone Voice, Tracking, Vocal Arrangement, Vocal Producer, Vocals (Background), Voices
John Hanes - Digital Editing
Heather - Performer, Telephone Voice, Voices
Heiku	- Producer
Timothy Hicks	- Vocals (Background)
Jerome Hipps - Executive Producer
Mick Jagger - Composer
Terese Joseph	- Recording Director

Kindred the Family Soul - Vocals, Vocals (Background), Guest Artist, Primary Artist, Vocals, Vocals (Background)
Kenny Lattimore - Vocals (Background)
John Lawson - Drums
Kevin Liles - Executive Producer
M.A.D.	- Composer, Producer
Henry Mancini - Composer
Michael McArthur - Executive Producer
Moms - Performer, Telephone Voice, Voices
Muriyd	- Performer, Telephone Voice, Voices
Musiq (Soulchild) - Composer, Primary Artist, Producer, Vocal Arrangement, Vocal Producer, Vocals, Vocals (Background)
UE Nastasi - Mastering
Olezski - Fender Rhodes
Bilal Oliver - Composer, Guest Artist, Performer, Telephone Voice, Vocal Arrangement, Vocal Producer, Vocals, Vocals (Background), Voices
Ben "Benanas" O'Neill	- Guitar
Ora - Performer, Telephone Voice, Voices
Tara Podolsky - A&R
Pops - Performer, Telephone Voice, Voices
Keith Richards - Composer
Carol Riddick	- Guest Artist, Primary Artist, Vocals, Vocals (Background)
John Roberts	- Drums, Percussion
Tim Roberts - Assistant
Dawn Robinson - Vocals (Background)
Franky "Vegas" Romano - Composer, Arranger, Bass, Guitar, Performer, Sitar, Telephone Voice, Voices
Tom Scott - Composer
James "Jayshawn" Smith	- Vocals (Background)
Johnnie "Smurf" Smith - Arranger, Instrumentation, Keyboards, Organ, Producer
Dexter Story - Marketing
Frank "Mumbles" Sullen	- Engineer, Tracking
Rick Tate Jr. - Saxophone
Torrie	- Performer, Telephone Voice, Voices
Thaddeus T. Tribbett - Bass
Eric Weissman - Sample Clearance
April Williams	- Vocals (Background)
Levar "Lil' Tone" Wilson - Vocals (Background)

Charts and certifications

Weekly charts

Certifications

Year-end charts

References

2003 albums
Albums produced by 88-Keys
Musiq Soulchild albums
Def Jam Recordings albums